The China-EU Institute for Clean and Renewable Energy at Huazhong University of Science & Technology (CE-ICARE) is an education and research institute located in Wuhan, China, created in July 2010 and hosted in Huazhong University of Science and Technology. ICARE is the third Sino-European institute being created in China after the China-EU International Business School  in Shanghai in 1994 (as China-EC Management Institute) and the China-EU School of Law in Beijing in 2008. ICARE project has a 5-year funding from EU and Chinese government.

The creation of ICARE follows an agreement signed in 2009 by European Commissioner for External Relations Benita Ferrero-Waldner and Chinese Minister for Foreign Trade GAO Hucheng in the frame of the collaboration between China and Europe for environmental protection and climate change mitigation.

ICARE mission is to support China in implementing activities in management and technology in order to reduce the consumption of fossil energy and carbon emissions through renewable energies and energy efficiency.

ICARE 
ICARE is providing education to university students as well as to Chinese professionals and as the strong will to become the reference institute on energy efficiency and renewable energy in China. ICARE relies on a partner consortium of higher-education institutions composed of 7 European members from 5 countries and 3 Chinese members.

France
ParisTech (4 out of the 12 higher-engineering and business schools in ParisTech), 
Mines ParisTech (as project coordinator),
Ecole Polytechnique,
Chimie ParisTech,
ENSTA ParisTech.
University of Perpignan Via Domitia, 
French International Office for Water (IOWater)
Spain
Zaragoza University
United Kingdom
Northumbria University
Greece
National Technical University of Athens
Italy
La Sapienza University
China
Huazhong University of Science and Technology in Wuhan
Wuhan University of Technology in Wuhan
Southeast University in Nanjing

Programmes offered

Master degree in Clean and Renewable Energy
It is a Double master's degree Programme, namely, the master programme of energy science and technology conferred by Huazhong University of Science and Technology (HUST) in China, and the master programme of clean and renewable energy granted by ParisTech (CARE ), for students who already have a degree in engineering or in another relevant scientific discipline in areas where there is a strong need for additional qualified workforce in China. Courses are taught in English by European and Chinese teachers, all experts in their fields. Main subjects are Solar Energy, Wind Energy, Biomass, Geothermal, Hydrogen and Energy Storage and Energy Efficiency. There is a six-month training period in laboratories in China or in Europe which allows the students to put into practice skills and knowledge acquired during courses. Presently 160 students are following the Master courses. First class was graduated (Master from ParisTech and Master from HuaZhong University) on March 15, 2013.

Vocational training (VT) for energy professionals
To meet the needs of domestic and international companies for professional training of their staff (decision makers, engineers, etc.) on CRE, ICARE aims at developing a VT platform. Tailored professional programmes are developed by European partners or associated partners. First sessions were held during three days in January 2013 on Photovoltaic energy technologies.

Research Platform
A Research Platform (RP) is developed to facilitate exchange of Ph.D. students between European and Chinese universities and co-supervision of research activities. RP is also a contact facilitator between European professors, during their teaching stays in ICARE, and Chinese professors to meet and develop common research projects. Every year top specialists in CREN fields are delivering conferences at ICARE.

References

External links
Official website English
Official website Chinese

Huazhong University of Science and Technology
ParisTech
Research institutes in China
European Commission
 
Research institutes established in 2012
Energy research institutes